The 2009 UNLV Rebels football team was the 42nd varsity football team to represent the University of Nevada, Las Vegas. The Rebels play in the Mountain West Conference and compete each season against the remaining eight members of the conference and one permanent interstate rival: Nevada. In 2009, UNLV also played non-conference games at home against Sacramento State, Oregon State and Hawaii. Mike Sanford entered his fifth and final season as UNLV's head coach and the Rebels played their home games at Sam Boyd Stadium in Whitney, Nevada.

In November, head coach Mike Sanford was fired after five losing seasons, a 16-43 record and no bowl appearances. He won his last game as head coach against San Diego State on November 28, 2009, 28-24, with a fourth quarter comeback.

Pre-season
At the 2009 Mountain West Conference Media Day in Las Vegas, the Rebels were picked to finish fifth in the conference, the highest preseason ranking since the Rebels were picked to finish tied for fifth with BYU in 2004.  ESPN NFL analyst Mel Kiper, Jr. named the Rebels, along with Miami (FL), California and SMU, as one of his sleepers that could make "national noise" in 2009.  Kiper stated: "If Omar Clayton, their quarterback, can stay healthy and get the ball to Ryan Wolfe, UNLV, I think, can go bowling for the first time in a long time and be a factor in the Mountain West Conference."  Paul Myerberg of The New York Times ranked UNLV in the 84th position in their preseason Quad Countdown, in front of Ball State and behind UTEP.  The ranking was an improvement of 27 spots from their 2008 preseason ranking of 111th.  Myerberg predicted that the Rebels would go 6-6 and earn their first bowl berth since their 2000 Las Vegas Bowl victory against Arkansas.

Junior quarterback Omar Clayton received much praise during the preseason including that from The New York Times and Mel Kiper, Jr. and was named as one of the favorites to be named the conference's Offensive Player of the Year by Bleacher Report's Mountain West Conference writer.  Senior wide receiver Ryan Wolfe was named as one of the best non-BCS receivers in the country by The New York Times and was named to the Biletnikoff Award watch list during the preseason.  Wolfe enters the season only 50 receptions and 900 yards away from breaking the conference's career receptions and receiving yards records.  Wolfe and senior linebacker Jason Beauchamp were both named to the All-MWC preseason team.

On July 3, 2009, sophomore linebacker Bryce Saldi suffered severe injuries following a skateboarding accident while in southern California.  Saldi was placed in the intensive care unit at Loma Linda University Medical Center.  There has been no word on a timetable for Saldi's return.

Key Losses
The following are some of the key players who will be no longer eligible to play in the 2009 season:

Offense:
 Johan Asiata (OL)
 Casey Flair (WR)
 Dack Ishii (QB)
 Mario Jeberaeel (OL)
 Sifa Moala (OL)
 David Peeples (RB)
 Richie Plunkett (OL)
 Gerold Rodriguez (WR)
 Renan Saint Preux (WR)
 Frank Summers (RB)
 Ryan Worthen (TE)

Defense:
 Lorenzo Bursey, Jr. (DB)
 George Fa'avae (DL)
 Jacob Hales (DL)
 Geoffery Howard (DB)
 Thor Pili (DE)
 Rusty Worthen (LB)

Recruiting

Schedule

Sources:

Game summaries

Sacramento State

UNLV opened their season as a 22-point favorite against FCS squad Sacramento State from the Big Sky Conference.  Both teams' passing games were hampered by the 32 mph wind gusts that were recorded around the stadium.  UNLV took a 10–3 lead into halftime after a one-yard touchdown run by junior runningback Channing Trotter and a 39-yard field goal by senior kicker Kyle Watson gave UNLV the 10–0 lead after the first quarter.  Sacramento State would get their only points of the game on a 44-yard field goal by Hornets' kicker Chris Diniz

In the second half, the Rebels would explode on offense, starting with another 1 yard touchdown run by Trotter late in the third quarter.  Trotter would score his third one-yard touchdown early in the fourth quarter to push the Rebels lead to 24–3.  The Rebels increased their lead midway through the fourth on a 55-yard strike from senior quarterback Omar Clayton to senior wide receiver Rodelin Anthony.  Clayton's backup, sophomore Mike Clausen, played the final minutes of the game and sealed the Rebels victory with a 4-yard touchdown run.  The win against Sacramento State was their fourth straight opener.

Oregon State

Hawai'i

Wyoming

Nevada

BYU

Utah

New Mexico

TCU

Colorado State

Air Force

San Diego State

References

UNLV
UNLV Rebels football seasons
UNLV Rebels football